Virginia's 3rd House of Delegates district is one of 100 seats in the Virginia House of Delegates, the lower house of the state's bicameral legislature. District 3, in Tazewell County, Buchanan County, Bland County, and Russell County, is represented by Republican Will Morefield.

Elections

2017 
In 2017, Morefield, 33, faced a primary challenge from attorney Bob Altizer, who promises to be an accessible legislator and to stand up for the interests of the coal industry. Altizer's prospects of winning the nomination seem to be bolstered by his having on his side former Buchannan County Commonwealth's Attorney Tamara Neo and former 9th District Chairman Jack Morgan, both of whom were part of Donald Trump's political leadership team, but in a mass meeting on 29 April, Morefield was selected as the Republican candidate.

In the November 2017 general election, Morefield, a four-term incumbent, was challenged by Democrat Bill Bunch. Bunch, 68, is a retired postal worker. However, Bunch was unable to win the seat and Morefield kept his position as incumbent.

District officeholders

Electoral history

References

External links
 

003
Tazewell County, Virginia
Buchanan County, Virginia
Bland County, Virginia
Russell County, Virginia